Naneh Karan (also Romanized as Naneh Karān, Nonah Karān, and Noneh Karān; also known as Nah Neh Karān, Nanakaran, Nonah Garān, Noneh Kapān, and Nunakaran) is a village in Vilkij-e Shomali Rural District of the Central District of Namin County, Ardabil province, Iran. At the 2006 census, its population was 898 in 243 households. The following census in 2011 counted 930 people in 309 households. The latest census in 2016 showed a population of 935 people in 312 households; it was the largest village in its rural district.

Former cleric & politician Fakhreddin Mousavi was born in Naneh Karan.

References 

Namin County

Towns and villages in Namin County

Populated places in Ardabil Province

Populated places in Namin County